Billbergia tweedieana is a species of flowering plant in the Bromeliaceae family. This species is endemic to southeastern Brazil.

Three varieties are recognized:

Billbergia tweedieana var. latisepala L.B.Sm. - Rio de Janeiro
Billbergia tweedieana var. minor L.B.Sm. - Espírito Santo
Billbergia tweedieana var. tweedieana - Espírito Santo and Rio de Janeiro

References

tweedieana
Endemic flora of Brazil
Flora of the Atlantic Forest
Flora of Espírito Santo
Flora of Rio de Janeiro (state)
Plants described in 1889
Taxa named by John Gilbert Baker